Belören may refer to:

 Belören, Bayat
 Belören, Demre, village in Antalya Province, Turkey
 Belören, Gölbaşı, village in Adıyaman Province, Turkey
 Belören, Ilgaz
 Belören, Kahta, village in Adıyaman Province, Turkey
 Belören, Yüreğir, village in Adana Province, Turkey